Vadu may refer to several villages in Romania:

 Vadu, a village in the commune of Corbu, Constanța
 Vadu, a village in the commune of Sântămăria-Orlea, Hunedoara County
 Vadu, a village in the commune of Vărgata, Mureș County

See also 
 Vad (disambiguation)